Celtic mazes are straight-line spiral key patterns that have been drawn all over the world since prehistoric times. The patterns originate in early Celtic developments in stone and metal-work, and later in medieval Insular art. Prehistoric spiral designs date back to Gavrinis (c. 3500 BCE).

The straight-line spirals of Celtic labyrinths originated in chevrons and lozenges and are drawn by the Celts using a connect the dots method.

See also 
 Celtic knot
 Labyrinth
 Prayer Labyrinth
 Maze, whose technical definition does not include "Celtic mazes"
 Spirangle

References 

4th-millennium BC establishments
Celtic art
Patterns
Spirals